Tuuli Narkle is an Australian actress. For her performance in Mystery Road: Origin she won the 2022 AACTA Award for Best Lead Actress in a Television Drama. 

Narkle began her career on stage with an appearance as Ruby in Stolen and in 2019 appeared in Winyanboga Yurringa and in Nakkiah Lui's Black Is The New White. In 2021 Narkle played the part of Evonne Goolagong Cawley in the stage show Sunshine Super Girl and in 2022 played Helen in Emme Hoy's adaptation of The Tenant of Wildfell Hall

Narkle played a lead role in the ABC TV series All My Friends are Racist in 2021. and then played a younger version of Tasma Walton's character Mary Swan in Mystery Road: Origin, a prequel season of Mystery Road. 2023 saw her in Bad Behaviour.

Narkle was born in Western Australia and is of Aboriginal and Finnish descent.

References

External links
 

 
Living people
Australian film actresses
Australian television actresses
Australian stage actresses
Indigenous Australian actresses